Joseph Manuel Montoya (September 24, 1915June 5, 1978) was an American politician and member of the Democratic Party who served as the lieutenant governor of New Mexico (1947–1951 and 1955–1957), in the U.S. House of Representatives (1957–1964) and as a U.S. senator from New Mexico (1964–1977).

Early life and education
Montoya was born in Peña Blanca, New Mexico. His parents, Thomas and Frances Montoya, were Roman Catholic descendants of eighteenth-century Spanish settlers to New Mexico. He received his early education in public schools in Sandoval County and graduated from Bernalillo High School in 1931. He continued his education at Regis College in Denver, Colorado. In 1934, he began law school at Georgetown University in Washington, D.C.

In 1936 at age 21, while Montoya was still at Georgetown, he became the youngest representative in the history of the state to be elected to the New Mexico House of Representatives. In 1938, Montoya graduated from law school and was re-elected. The following year, he was elected the Democratic majority floor leader.

Career
Montoya was elected to the New Mexico Senate in 1940, once again becoming the youngest member of that body ever elected. By the time he left the Senate in 1946, Montoya had been twice reelected to the State Senate and held the positions of majority whip and chairman of the Judiciary Committee. From 1947 to 1957 he was elected Lieutenant Governor of New Mexico three times and also served two additional terms in the State Senate.

In 1957 Montoya was elected to the U.S. House of Representatives in a special election after the sudden death of the recently reelected New Mexico Congressman Antonio M. Fernández. In Congress, Montoya gained a recognition as a political moderate, a dedicated Democrat, and a diligent legislator — qualities that earned him the esteem of his fellow legislators and made him an effective congressman. In 1962, he defeated Republican Jack C. Redman, M.D.

In 1963, he became a member of the House Appropriations Committee where he was a strong advocate of education measures and soon authored the Vocational Education Act. In 1964, he sponsored the Wilderness Act, which protected wilderness areas. Montoya won the 1964 Senate election to complete the term of Dennis Chavez, who died in office. Montoya won even though the Governor of New Mexico, Edwin L. Mechem, had resigned the governorship in order fill the seat temporarily. Thus began a twelve-year career in the Senate, where he served on the Appropriations Committee, the Public Works Committee, the Joint Committee on Atomic Energy, and Senate Watergate Committee.

In 1976, a year that was a Democratic victory nationwide, Montoya was defeated by Republican Harrison Schmitt 57% to 42%.

Death 
Montoya died in Washington, D.C., at the age of 62.

See also
 List of Hispanic and Latino Americans in the United States Congress
 List of minority governors and lieutenant governors in the United States

References

External links

 Inventory of the Joseph M. Montoya Papers, 1913–1977, Center for Southwest Research, University of New Mexico.

|-

|-

|-

|-

1915 births
1978 deaths
20th-century American politicians
American people of Spanish descent
Georgetown University Law Center alumni
Democratic Party members of the United States House of Representatives from New Mexico
Democratic Party United States senators from New Mexico
Hispanic and Latino American state legislators in New Mexico
Hispanic and Latino American members of the United States Congress
Lieutenant Governors of New Mexico
Democratic Party members of the New Mexico House of Representatives
Neomexicanos
Democratic Party New Mexico state senators
Regis University alumni
Watergate scandal investigators